Club Atlético Talleres (mostly known simply as Talleres  or Talleres de Córdoba ) is an Argentine football club from the city of Córdoba. They are the women's football section of the sports club of the same name.

It was founded in 1913 and has played the Torneo Amateur Femenino de la Liga Cordobesa de Fútbol and División A since 2012. Although women's football became professional in Argentina in 2019, this only reached teams located near Buenos Aires. Because of this, Talleres still has non-professional footballers and participates in amateur tournaments in Córdoba.

Even so, it is one of the greatest exponents of women's football at a regional and national level, yielding players to the Argentine national team on numerous occasions and selling players to professional teams.

In 2022, Talleres will start playing in Primera C, the third division of the women's national league.

History
In 2012, the first Torneo Amateur Femenino organized by the Liga Cordobesa de Fútbol was held. All teams affiliated with this regional league were required to submit a women's team for this season. The regulations indicated that two 30-minute halves would be played, up to seven changes could be made and that if there was a difference of seven goals, the match would be finalized. In addition, the women's teams depended on the performance of the men's equivalents to access the final instances of the local competition.

During this time, Valentina Mansilla, Shirley Sosa, Milagros Cisneros and Sofía Muñoz were called up several times to represent the Argentina under-17 and under-20 national team. Other later call-ups include Milagros Mina (under-20), Catalina Primo (under-19 and under-20), Jazmín Allende, Magalí Chavero and Paulina Gramaglia (under-17).

Florencia Pianello was top scorer in 2017 and 2018. She is the all-time top scorer in Talleres with 135 goals in three years. The international Argentine player would later sign Platense, a team in Primera División, but come back at the end of 2021 to play with "las Matadoras" again. In 2022, Talleres was confirmed to play in Primera C national league.

References

Talleres de Córdoba
Association football clubs established in 1913
Football clubs in Córdoba Province, Argentina
Women's football clubs in Argentina
1913 establishments in Argentina